Aahaa or Aahaa..! may refer to:

Aahaa..! (1997 film), Indian Tamil-language film
Aahaa..! (1998 film), Indian Telugu-language film